This is a list of the National Register of Historic Places listings in Salem, Massachusetts.

This is intended to be a complete list of the properties and districts on the National Register of Historic Places in Salem, Massachusetts, United States. The locations of National Register properties and districts for which the latitude and longitude coordinates are included below, may be seen in an online map.

Essex County, of which Salem is a part, is the location of more than 450 properties and districts listed on the National Register, including 25 National Historic Landmarks. Salem itself is the location of 46 of these properties and districts, including 8 National Historic Landmarks.

Current listings

|}

See also

List of National Historic Landmarks in Massachusetts
National Register of Historic Places listings in Essex County, Massachusetts
National Register of Historic Places listings in Massachusetts

References

Salem
Salem, Massachusetts